.
Central banks
Central banks
Central banks
This is a list of central banks. Countries that are only partially recognized internationally are marked with an asterisk (*).

Disappeared central banking jurisdictions

  – Bank of Amsterdam (1609-1791)
  – Taula de canvi de Barcelona (1401-1714)
  – East African Currency Board (1919-1966)
  –  (Hrvatska Državna Banka, 1941-1945)
  – National Bank of Czechoslovakia (1926–1939 and 1945-1950) and State Bank of Czechoslovakia (1950–1992)
  –  (1854-1875)
  – Bank of Saint George (1407-1805)
  –  (1948-1968) and Staatsbank der DDR (1968-1990)
  – Hamburger Bank (1619-1875)
  – Bank of Korea (1909–1950)
  – Central Bank of Manchou (1932-1945)
  - Bank of Issue in Poland (1940-1945)
  – National Bank of Vietnam (1954-1975)
  – Banco di Napoli, under different names from 1463 to final end of central banking role in 1926
  – Banca di Firenze (1816-1893), renamed  from 1857
  – People's Bank (1917-1922) and Gosbank (1922-1991)
  – Banco del Giro (1524-1806)
  – the National Bank of Serbia, successively named National Bank of the Kingdom of Serbs, Croats and Slovenes (1920-1929), National Bank of the Kingdom of Yugoslavia (1929-1946), and National Bank of Yugoslavia (1946-2003)

See also

 Central banks and currencies of Africa
 Central banks and currencies of the Caribbean
 Central banks and currencies of Central America and South America
 Central banks and currencies of Europe
 List of currencies
 International Monetary Fund Lender of last resort to countries short of liquidity
 Bank for International Settlementsan international organisation which fosters international monetary and financial cooperation and serves as a bank for central banks.

Notes

External links

 Centralbanksguide.com: Central Banks of the World website
 BIS.org:  Bank for International Settlements−BIS.org: List of Central banks of the World — with links to websites.